Pyrocleptria cora is a species of moth of the family Noctuidae. It has a very scattered distribution in Europe. It is known from a few localities in Romania and Russia as well as two locations in the Hautes-Alpes in France.

The larvae feed on Thalictrum species.

External links
Fauna Europaea
Species records from France
Species info on Moths and Butterflies of Europe and North Africa
Lepiforum.de

Heliothinae
Moths of Europe
Moths of Asia
Taxa named by Eduard Friedrich Eversmann